Kirk S. Schanze is an American chemist previously at the University of Florida and currently the Professor and Robert A. Welch Distinguished University Chair in Chemistry at the University of Texas at San Antonio and Editor-in-Chief of ACS Applied Materials & Interfaces.

References 

University of Florida faculty
21st-century American chemists
University of Texas faculty
Fellows of the American Chemical Society
University of North Carolina alumni
Florida State University alumni
Living people
Year of birth missing (living people)
Place of birth missing (living people)